Temryuk is a town in Krasnodar Krai, Russia.

Temryuk may also refer to:
Temryuk Bay, a bay of the Sea of Azov, Russia
Temryuk of Kabardia, Christian Kabardian prince, father of Maria Temryukovna, second wife of Ivan the Terrible
Mariya Temryuk-Cherkasova, maiden name of the mother of Igor Sikorsky, Russian-American aviation pioneer